Flight 618 may refer to:

Alitalia Flight 618, crashed on 26 February 1960
Linjeflyg Flight 618, crashed on 15 January 1977

0618